The 2009–10 season was Juventus Football Club's 112th in existence and third consecutive season in the top flight of Italian football.

Domestically, the team competed in Serie A, finishing seventh, as well as in the Coppa Italia, where they were eliminated in the quarter-finals. Having finished second in 2008–09, Juventus automatically qualified for a place in the group stage of the UEFA Champions League. After drawing their first two games, against Bordeaux and Bayern Munich, and winning their next two, a double header against Maccabi Haifa, the team lost their last two group stage games, including a 4–1 home defeat against Bayern Munich on the last matchday. As a result, they finished third in their group and qualified for a place in the Round of 32 in the UEFA Europa League. In this secondary competition, Juventus were knocked out in the Round of 16 after the second leg ended as a 4–1 (5–4 on aggregate) loss for the second time in Europe, this time in England against Fulham.

Players

Squad information

Players in the squad list A and B submitted to UEFA were indicated by EL and EL B respectively. Buffon, Molinaro and Tiago were in 2009–10 UEFA Champions League, they were make way for new signing Candreva and Paolucci.

Reserve squad

Players in the squad list B submitted to UEFA were indicated by EL B.

Berretti squad

Players in the squad list B submitted to UEFA were indicated by EL B.

Transfers

In

Out

Loaned out

Financial Summary

This section displays the club's financial expenditure's in the transfer market. Because all transfer fee's are not disclosed to the public, the numbers displayed in this section are only based on figures released by media outlets.

Spending
Summer:   €52,500,000

Winter:    €0,000,000

Total:    €52,500,000

Income
Summer:   €14,500,000

Winter:    €0,000,000

Total:    €14,500,000

Expenditure
Summer:  €38,000,000

Winter:   €0,000,000

Total:   €38,000,000

Pre-season and friendlies

Friendly matches

Peace Cup

Group stage

Knockout phase

Competitions

Serie A

League table

Results summary

Results by round

Matches

Coppa Italia

UEFA Champions League

Group stage

UEFA Europa League

Knockout phase

Round of 32

Round of 16

Statistics

Overall

1 Includes Champions League and Europa League

Goalscorers

Disciplinary record 

Includes all competitive matches. Players with 1 card or more included only.

1 Includes Champions League and Europa League

References

Juventus F.C. seasons
Juventus